Aba is a noble kindred (genus) of the Kingdom of Hungary which according to the Gesta Hungarorum ("The Deeds of the Hungarians" part 32) derives from Pata (Latin: Pota) who was a nephew to Ed and Edemen and the ancestor of Samuel Aba. Some modern scholars have proposed that the family's ancestors may have been among the tribal leaders of the Kabars (three nomadic tribes that joined the tribal federation of the Magyars in the 9th century). The Gesta Hunnorum et Hungarorum ("The Deeds of the Huns and the Hungarians", 1282–85) connects the family to Attila the Hun.

The Gesta Hungarorum mentions that Ed and Edemen received land possession around the forest of the Mátra Mountains, especially in Gyöngyöspata – Heves County, after the conquest of the Carpathian Basin by the Magyars (around 895). Pata built a castle in their forest where centuries later Oliver, Pata's descendant through Samuel Aba was slain by the descendants of Ed and Edemen during the reign of Ladislaus IV.

Notable Members
Prince Shaba who wed Princess Sarolta the daughter of Géza, Grand Prince of the Hungarians. 

Samuel Aba was the most prominent member of the family who became King of Hungary (1041–1044). The gens may have been named after him. 

Oliver of the House of Aba who inherited Pata's Castle in the forest of the Mátra was slain there by the descendants of Ed and Edemen during the reign of Ladislaus IV. 

Makján Aba was Palatine of Hungary in the 13th century and a staunch supporter of Ladislaus IV. 

Amade Aba is another prominent descendant of the family; he held several castles and possessions on the northern and north-eastern parts of the kingdom in the first decade of the 14th century.

Branches
The gens divided into several families in the course of the centuries.

Today there are nineteen noble families that directly descend from the Royal House of Aba, and belong to Clan Aba – “Genus Aba”. They are: Athinai, Báthory of the Clan Aba, Báthory de Gagy, Bertóthy, Budaméry, Csirke, Csobánka, Frichi, Gagyi, Hedry, Keczer, Kompolthi, Laczkffy de Nádasd, Lapispataky, Rhédey, Sennyey, Sirokay, Somosy de Somos, Vendéghy and Vitéz.

Various members of the Rhédey von Kis-Rhéde branch of Genus Aba held many royal offices and acquired many hereditary titles. Among them – Voivod (Dukes) and Princes of Transylvania, Counts of Rhédey von Kis-Rhéde, Hereditary Count Palatines of the Holy Roman Empire, Papal Count Palatines of the Lateran Palace and Countess von Hohenstein.

Sources
 Kristó, Gyula (editor): Korai Magyar Történeti Lexikon – 9–14. század (Encyclopedia of the Early Hungarian History – 9–14th centuries); Akadémiai Kiadó, 1994, Budapest; .

See also
Samuel Aba of Hungary
Palatine Amade Aba
Makján Aba
Nicholas Aba – Ban of Dalmatia and Croatia (1272–1273)
List of rulers of Transylvania
Klaudia Rhédey de Kis-Rhéde
Upper nobility (Kingdom of Hungary)
Abaújvár
Battle of Rozgony
Borsod-Abaúj-Zemplén
Palatine (Kingdom of Hungary)
Western Roman Empire
Byzantine Empire
Byzantine Emperors

References

External links
House of Aba Genealogy

 
Hungarian nobility